Jennifer Frank may refer to
Jenny Lamy (later Frank, born 1949), Australian sprinter
Jenny Orr (later Frank, born 1953), Australian runner